(Forget-me-not), WAB 93, is a cantata composed by Anton Bruckner in 1845.

History 
Bruckner's examination, which was held in Linz on 27 and 28 May 1845, was successful.

A slightly modified, second version was dedicated to Alois Knauer, the parish priest of Kronstorf. The performance occurred on 21 June 1845 (Knauer's name day) or the evening before.

The third version, entitled  (Forget-me-not), was sent to Friedrich Mayer, who was at that time prebendary and choirmaster of the St. Florian Abbey, to remind him of the promise to provide Bruckner with an employment in the Abbey after his successful teacher examination. It is not known when it was performed.

The manuscripts of the first and second versions are stored at the Österreichische Nationalbibliothek. The manuscript of the third version is stored in the archive of the St. Florian Abbey. A facsimile of the third version was first issued in band I, pp. 286–300 of the Göllerich/Auer biography.

Text 

The work is based on the eleven-strophe poem  (The mother and her child) by W. Dobelbaur.

Setting 
The cantata in D major is scored for  choir,  soloists and piano. The 149-bar long work is in seven movements:
Eingangschor: Es blühten wunderschön auf der Aue - four-part mixed choir
Recitative: Der Knabe saß hold auf der Mutter Schooß - soprano and alto
Arie: Sie küsste den Knaben herzlich - soprano and alto
Duet: Die Mutter erfreute das freudige Schweben - soprano and alto, Allegro
Quartet: Verborgen unter blumiger Hülle - soprano, alto, tenor and bass
Duet: Die ringelt' und raschelt' im Grase fort - tenor and bass, Moderato
Schlußchor: Wie welkt ein Blümchen im Morgenroth - eight-part mixed choir  a cappella, Andante
The third version is 7 bars shorter (142 bars), and the first duet: soprano and alto, is replaced by a duet: soprano and tenor.

References

Sources 
 August Göllerich, Anton Bruckner. Ein Lebens- und Schaffens-Bild,  – posthumous edited by Max Auer by G. Bosse, Regensburg, 1932
 Uwe Harten, Anton Bruckner. Ein Handbuch. , Salzburg, 1996. 
 Anton Bruckner – Sämtliche Werke, Band XXII/1: Kantaten und Chorwerke I (1845–1855), Musikwissenschaftlicher Verlag der Internationalen Bruckner-Gesellschaft, Franz Burkhart, Rudolf H. Führer and Leopold Nowak (Editor), Vienna, 1987 (Available on IMSLP: Neue Gesamtausgabe, XXII/1. Kantaten und Chorwerke Teil 1: Nr. 1-5)
 Cornelis van Zwol, Anton Bruckner 1824–1896 – Leven en werken, uitg. Thoth, Bussum, Netherlands, 2012. 
 Crawford Howie, Anton Bruckner - A documentary biography, online revised edition

External links 
 
 Musikalischer Versuch nach dem Kammer-Styl D-Dur, WAB 93 a/b, Vergißmeinnicht D-Dur, WAB 93c - Critical discography by Hans Roelofs 

Cantatas by Anton Bruckner
1845 compositions
Compositions in D major